Dr. Nand Lal is the current Vice Chancellor of Sri Sri University. Before joining Sri Sri University he was Dean at Faculty of Science and also the Dean Research and Development, Kurukshetra University.

Career
He studied at Kurukshetra University, Haryana for his B.Sc (Hons) in Physics, M.Sc. in Physics and Ph.D in Physics. He is a specialist in Nuclear Geophysics and Solid Earth Physics

Projects and training
He received grants from Department of law and Technology, Government of India 
He has presided over several national and international training programmes.

Media coverage
Dr R Seetharaman receives his doctorate degree in "Green Banking and Sustainability" from Sri Sri University vice chancellor Dr Nand Lal
KU gets funds to develop research facility

References

External links
Life Member of Nuclear Track Society of India
Google Scholar Profile

Academic staff of Sri Sri University
Kurukshetra University alumni
Living people
Year of birth missing (living people)
Academic staff of Kurukshetra University